Lanao Chung Hua School is the first and only existing Chinese school in Iligan City. It was founded on November 12, 1938.

References

Chinese-language schools in the Philippines
Schools in Iligan
High schools in the Philippines